was a Japanese graphic designer who was a pioneer of modern Japanese graphic design.

Early life
He was born in Matsuyama City, Ehime Prefecture in 1876. 
He graduated from the Japanese-style painting department of Tokyo School of Art, which is the present Tokyo University of the Arts, in 1901.

At first, he was aiming to become a Japanese-style painter and he studied under Matsuura Ganki, a Japanese style painter of the Shijō school. 
He went to Tokyo in 1897. Afterward, he studied under Kawabata Gyokusho. 
He entered the Japanese-style painting department of Tokyo School of Art. 
He learned the western-style painting and the European-style design from Kuroda Seiki while he was attending the Tokyo School of Art.

Professional life
After he graduated from the school, he became a designer and worked for the Osaka Sanwa print shop, assuming the position of design chief.
However, because the company's design department closed the next year, he left the shop.

He went to Shimane as a junior high school teacher in 1904, then went to Tokyo again the following year and began working for the Tokyo Chuo Shinbun. 
In 1908 he became a non-regular employee designer in the Mitsukoshi dry goods shop, taking charge of the cover of Mitsukoshi Times.  He became the store's design chief in 1910 and so he left the newspaper company. 
The magazine Mitsukoshi began to be published in 1911.
He became the lecturer of the design department of Nihon Bijutsu Gakko (Japan School of Art) and became the adviser to Calpis Co., a beverage manufacturer, in 1921.

He went to Europe to study modern graphic design from 1922 to 1924.
Having returned to Japan, he formed "Hichininsha," a group to study posters, in 1925.  
He designed the poster of the Tokyo Metro Ginza Line opening to traffic in 1927. 
It can be said that his works during this period led the early stages of Japanese commercial design.

He became design department chief  of Imperial School of Fine Arts (present Musashino Art University) in 1929. 
He is one of the founders of the Tama Teikoku Bijutsu Gakko (present Tama Art University) in 1935.

His wife is Sugiura Suiko (1885-1960) who was a poet of the Araragi faction.
She was influenced by Kitahara Hakushu.

Works
Mitsukoshi Poster (angel design) (1915)
Tokyo Underground Railway (present Tokyo Metro Ginza Line Ueno-Asakusa section) opening advertisement poster (1927)
the 3rd Exhibition of "Hichininsha" poster (1928)
Hisui Sōsaku Zuan (1930)
Package design of cigarette 'Hibiki' (1932)
Package design of cigarette 'Hikari' (1936)

Many of his works are stored at the National Museum of Modern Art, Tokyo and The Museum of Art, Ehime.

Award

Japan Art Academy Imperial Award in 1955. 
Medals of Honor (Japan) with Purple Ribbon in 1958.

References

Graphic Design no Seiki (Tokyo: Bijutushuppansha, 2008) 

Japanese graphic designers
1965 deaths
1876 births
Recipients of the Medal with Purple Ribbon
Artist from Ehime Prefecture